Two-Time Mama is a 1927 American silent comedy film featuring Oliver Hardy.

Cast
 Tyler Brooke as Mr. Dazzle  The Devil
 Anita Garvin as Mrs. Dazzle
 Glenn Tryon as Mr. Brown
 Vivien Oakland - Mrs. Brown
 Gale Henry as Nora a.k.a. Snoopy, the Maid
 Jackie Hanes
 Oliver Hardy as Cop (as Babe Hardy)

See also
 List of American films of 1927
 Oliver Hardy filmography

External links

1927 films
American silent short films
American black-and-white films
1927 comedy films
1927 short films
Films directed by Fred Guiol
Silent American comedy films
American comedy short films
1920s American films